Refusal Fossil is the sixth album by Ruins, released in 1997 through Skin Graft Records.  In 2007, Skin Graft released a special edition with five extra tracks, easily identified by a different text font for the band name and title.

Track listing

Tracks 13–17 were added for the 2007 special edition release.
Tracks 1–16 were recorded in Koenji and Asagaya, 1995–1997.
Tracks 17–26 were recorded live at Showboat, Tokyo on February 7, 1997.

Personnel 
Ruins
Hisashi Sasaki – vocals, bass guitar
Tatsuya Yoshida – vocals, drums
Ryuichi Masuda – bass guitar (tracks 8, 10, 11)
Naruyoshi Kikuchi - alto saxophone (tracks 17–21)
Emi Eleonola - vocals (track 22)
Seiichi Yamamoto - guitar (track 23)
Kenichi Oguchi – keyboards (track 24)
Production and additional personnel
Ruins – production
Jim O'Rourke – assistant producer

References

External links 
 

1997 albums
Ruins (Japanese band) albums
Skin Graft Records albums